Islam in Scotland includes all aspects of the Islamic faith in Scotland. The first Muslim known to have been in Scotland was a medical student who studied at the University of Edinburgh from 1858 to 1859. The production of goods and Glasgow's busy port meant that many lascars were employed there. Most Muslims in Scotland are members of families that immigrated in the later decades of the 20th century. At the 2011 census, Muslims comprised 1.4 percent of Scotland's population (76,737).

History
The first named Muslim known in Scotland was Wazir Beg from Bombay (now "Mumbai"). He is recorded as being a medical student who studied at the University of Edinburgh in 1858 and 1859. Manufacturing and Glasgow's busy seaport meant that many Lascars were employed there. Dundee was at the peak of importing jute, and sailors from Bengal were also seen at its port. Records from the Glasgow Sailors' Home show that nearly a third (5,500) of the boarders in 1903 were Muslim Lascars.

However, the immigration of Muslims to Scotland is a relatively recent event. The majority of Scottish Muslims are members of families who immigrated in the late 20th century. Scotland's Muslims in 2001 represented just 0.9% of the population (42,557), with 30,000 in Glasgow. By 2011, the Muslim population had increased to 76,737, accounting for 1.4% of Scotland's population.

Demographics
Muslims in Scotland are an ethnically diverse population. Although a majority of Muslims are of Pakistani (58%) origin, 9.8% are Arab, 7.8% are White European and 7% are African. Glasgow has the highest Muslim population of any city in Scotland with 5% of residents identifying as Muslim in the 2011 census. Pollokshields and Southside Central are the wards with the highest concentration of Muslim residents – 27.8% and 15.7% respectively. 37.3% of Muslim in Scotland were born in Scotland, with another 7.3% born elsewhere in the United Kingdom. Edinburgh is home to the second highest population of Muslims in Scotland. Taken together, Glasgow and Edinburgh are home to around 60% of all Muslims in Scotland.

Identity
According to information from the 2011 Scottish census, 71% of Muslims in Scotland consider their only national identity to be Scottish or British (or any combination of UK identities). The census concluded "Muslims have a strong sense of belonging to Scotland in particular and the UK more generally."

Education and employment

In 2011, 37.5% of Scottish Muslims held degree level qualifications compared to the Scotland average of 27.1%. 21.4% of Muslims in Scotland had no qualifications, slightly lower than the 22.9% average for Scotland. Only 4.5% of Muslims in Scotland had poor English language skills.

Muslims in Scotland in 2011 were less likely to be employed full-time (31%) than the general population (51%). Contributing factors for this include Muslims being more likely to be students (19%) than the general population (6%), and 25% of Muslim women 'looking after the home or family', in comparison to 5.6% of women from the overall population. 8.7% of Scottish Muslims were unemployed, whereas 6.3% of the general population were unemployed. Approximately a third of Scottish Muslims working full-time are self-employed, compared with 12% of the general population.

Mosques

Some important mosques in the major cities of Scotland are Glasgow Central Mosque, Edinburgh Central Mosque, Aberdeen Mosque and Islamic Centre, and Dundee Central Mosque.

Notable Scottish Muslims
 Aamer Anwar, Leading Lawyer & Campaigner
 Ali Abbasi, Gaelic television presenter.
 Bashir Ahmad - first Asian Member of the Scottish Parliament (2007–09)
 Tasmina Ahmed-Sheikh - politician who served as a Member of Parliament (MP) for Ochil and South Perthshire, 2015-2017, Scottish National Party Trade and Investment spokesperson, Deputy Shadow Leader of the House in the House of Commons, and the SNP's National Women's and Equalities Convener.
 Abdal-Qadir As-Sufi (Ian Dallas)
 Bashir Mann, former Labour councillor
 Misbah Iram Ahmed Rana (Molly Campbell)
 Humza Yousaf MSP
Anas Sarwar MSP - Leader of the Scottish Labour Party 
 Mohammad Sarwar MP - First Muslim MP at Westminster from 1997 to 2010. His son Anas Sarwar held the same seat from 2010 to 2015 and has been an MSP since 2016.
 Mona Siddiqui - is a British Muslim academic, currently is a University of Edinburgh's Professor of Islam and Interreligious studies, as well a regular contributor to BBC Radio 4, The Times, Scotsman, The Guardian, The Herald
Kaukab Stewart  - the first female of Pakistani descent to be elected as a Member of the Scottish Parliament (MSP) in 2021
 Viscount Reidhaven, eldest son of the Earl of Seafield.
 Osama Saeed, chief executive of the Scottish-Islamic Foundation & Former Head of Al-Jazeera Global PR & Marketing 
 Mushtaq Ahmad, lord lieutenant of Lanarkshire.
 Zara Mohammed, First female and youngest ever Secretary-General of the Muslim Council of Britain

See also
 Islam by country
 Islam in the United Kingdom
 Muslim Council of Scotland
 The Muslim Weekly
 Scottish Muslims
 Demographics of Scotland
 British Asian
 Asian-Scots
 New Scots

References

External links

The Muslim Council of Scotland
Census 2001: Key Statistics of Scotland (PDF, religion KS027)
, Islam Online 
"Islam misunderstood", BBC
Scottish Left Review article on Islam in Scotland
Scottish Pakistanis and Education